Luís Carlos Rocha Rodrigues (born 13 August 1986), known as Rocha, is a Portuguese professional footballer who plays for Moreirense F.C. as a central defender.

Having played in the lower levels until the age of 26, he spent most of his professional career in the second tier, making over 200 appearances in service of six clubs and winning promotion at Famalicão, Farense and Chaves. He also recorded 42 Primeira Liga games for Feirense and had a brief spell in the Belarusian Premier League at Dinamo Minsk.

Club career
In 2013 he signed with Segunda Liga club S.C. Covilhã, making his debut in the competition on 11 August of that year in a 1–0 away loss against C.S. Marítimo B. He scored his first goal on 5 October, as the visitors defeated FC Porto B 2–1.

On 9 June 2016, after a further two seasons in the second tier with S.C. Freamunde, Rocha joined C.D. Feirense on a one-year contract. His first match in the Primeira Liga took place on 15 August, when he played the full 90 minutes in a 2–0 away win over G.D. Estoril Praia. He added a further 17 appearances until the end of the campaign, helping to an eighth-place finish.

Rocha scored his first goal in the Portuguese top flight on 24 September 2017, but in a 1–4 home loss to C.F. Os Belenenses. With his second, the hosts won 1–0 but he was also sent off in the 36th minute of the fixture against Rio Ave FC.

On 15 June 2018, 31-year-old Rocha moved abroad for the only time in his career, to FC Dinamo Minsk of the Belarusian Premier League. He made nine appearances for the team from the capital city – including his only four European appearances in the UEFA Europa League qualifiers – and scored once to open a 1–1 home draw with FC Dynamo Brest on 28 October.

At the end of January 2019, Rocha reached a mutual agreement to end his time in Minsk, and he returned to his country's second tier on a 2-year deal at F.C. Famalicão. Having contributed ten games and two goals to their promotion as runners-up, he remained at that level by being loaned to S.C. Farense in August. 

On 5 June 2020, after a second consecutive promotion, Rocha moved to G.D. Chaves. He scored five goals in his first season with the Trás-os-Montes club, starting with the opener on 15 October as his team began the campaign with a 4–0 victory at Feirense on 15 October; on 24 January 2021 he netted both goals of a 2–1 home win over F.C. Arouca.

Having won another promotion, Rocha again opted to remain in the second tier in June 2022, signing for newly relegated Moreirense F.C. on a one-year deal.

References

External links

1986 births
Living people
Sportspeople from Guimarães
Portuguese footballers
Association football defenders
Primeira Liga players
Liga Portugal 2 players
Segunda Divisão players
Vitória S.C. players
AD Oliveirense players
SC Mirandela players
Merelinense F.C. players
A.D. Lousada players
F.C. Vizela players
S.C. Covilhã players
S.C. Freamunde players
C.D. Feirense players
F.C. Famalicão players
S.C. Farense players
G.D. Chaves players
Moreirense F.C. players
Belarusian Premier League players
FC Dinamo Minsk players
Portuguese expatriate footballers
Expatriate footballers in Belarus